The 1956 European Women's Basketball Championship was the 5th regional championship held by FIBA Europe for women. The competition was held in Prague, Czechoslovakia and took place June 2–10, 1956. The Soviet Union won their fourth consecutive gold medal, with Czechoslovakia and Bulgaria repeating their performance of the previous tournament, winning silver and bronze respectively.

Preliminary round
The teams were divided into four groups. The first two from each group would go to the Semi-Final Round. The remaining teams went to the Classification Round to determine the 9th–16th spots.

Group A

Group B

Group C

Group D

Classification round
The top two from each group advanced to the 9th–12th classification bracket. The 13th–16th spots were decided between the remaining teams in a separate bracket.

Group 1

Group 2

9th–12th place

13th–16th place

Semi-final round
The top two from each group advanced to the medal bracket. The 5th–8th spots were decided between the remaining teams in a separate bracket.

Group 1

Group 2

5th–8th place

Medal bracket

Final standings

External links
 FIBA Archive

1956
1956 in women's basketball
1956 in Czechoslovak women's sport
International basketball competitions hosted by Czechoslovakia
June 1956 sports events in Europe
Women's basketball in Czechoslovakia
1955–56 in European basketball